The Wisconsin Off Road Series (usually WORS) is an off-road bicycle racing series in Wisconsin, United States. The series is billed as "America's largest state mountain bike racing series."

History
The series began in 1991 as six separate races that were connected by a points system and overall scoring. The series has evolved to a twelve-race season. The series has 17% female participation, which is far above the national average of around 9%.

The series has been sanctioned by the National Off-Road Bicycle Association since 2003, when it averaged over 800 riders per event.

Classes
There are five classes (listed from lowest to highest difficulty level)
Citizen Youth
Citizen
Sport
Comp
Elite

References

"Top cyclocross racers look for season doubles", Tom Held, "November 17, 2006, Milwaukee Journal Sentinel, Retrieved April 7, 2007

External links
Official website
Schedule

Recurring sporting events established in 1991
Mountain biking events in the United States
Cycling in Wisconsin